Karen Nguyen (born ) is an Australian female artistic gymnast, representing her nation at international competitions.  

She participated at the 2004 Summer Olympics. She also competed at world championships, including the 2006 World Artistic Gymnastics Championships in  Aarhus, Denmark.

References

External links
http://corporate.olympics.com.au/athlete/karen-nguyen
Karen Nguyen at Sports Reference
http://www.intlgymnast.com/index.php?option=com_content&view=article&id=913:liddick-aussies-may-make-big-move-this-year&catid=2:news&Itemid=166
http://www.abc.net.au/news/2004-08-16/aussies-make-team-final-in-gymnastics/2026770

1987 births
Living people
Australian female artistic gymnasts
Place of birth missing (living people)
Gymnasts at the 2004 Summer Olympics
Olympic gymnasts of Australia
21st-century Australian women